Destroyed may refer to:

 Destroyed (Sloppy Seconds album), a 1989 album by Sloppy Seconds
 Destroyed (Moby album), a 2011 album by Moby

See also
 Destruction (disambiguation)
 Ruined (disambiguation)